David Grimm may refer to:
 David Grimm (writer) (born 1965), American playwright and screenwriter
 David Grimm (architect) (1823–1898), Russian architect
 David Grimm (lawyer) (1864–1941), Russian and Estonian lawyer, politician
 David Grimm (entrepreneur) (born 1990), American entrepreneur